Lamoine is the name of the following places in the United States:

 Lamoine, Maine, a town
 Lamoine, Washington, an unincorporated community
 Lamoine Hotel, a historic hotel in Macomb, Illinois
 LaMoine River, a tributary of the Illinois River
 Lamoine Township, McDonough County, Illinois

See also
 
 Lemoine (disambiguation)